John Tarkpor Sonkaliey (born 16 October 1986) is a Liberian footballer (midfielder) who currently plays for Persijap Jepara. He is also a member of the Liberia national football team.

Honours

Club honors
Mighty Blue Angels
Liberian Cup (1): 2002

External links 

1986 births
Living people
Liberian footballers
Liberia international footballers
Association football midfielders
Pelita Jaya FC players
Expatriate footballers in Indonesia
Liga 1 (Indonesia) players
Sportspeople from Monrovia
Liberian expatriates in Indonesia
Pelita Bandung Raya players